is a Japanese boxer. He competed in the men's featherweight event at the 1956 Summer Olympics.

References

1934 births
Living people
Japanese male boxers
Olympic boxers of Japan
Boxers at the 1956 Summer Olympics
Place of birth missing (living people)
Asian Games medalists in boxing
Boxers at the 1958 Asian Games
Asian Games silver medalists for Japan
Medalists at the 1958 Asian Games
Featherweight boxers
20th-century Japanese people